Alfred Viola (June 16, 1919 – February 21, 2007) was an American jazz guitarist who worked with Frank Sinatra for 25 years. He played the mandolin on the soundtrack of the film The Godfather.

Biography

Viola grew up in an Italian family in Brooklyn and learned to play the guitar and mandolin as a teenager. He enlisted in the Army during World War II from 1942 to 1945 and played in an Army jazz band. After he was discharged in 1946, he and Page Cavanaugh, whom he had met while serving in the Army, formed a trio with bassist Lloyd Pratt. The band appeared in several films, including Romance on the High Seas with Doris Day, and played a few dates in 1946 and 1947 with Frank Sinatra. Viola continued to work with Sinatra regularly, accompanying him on several hundred studio recordings and concert dates between 1956 and 1980.

Viola was a session musician in Los Angeles, performing in films, television and in commercials. His mandolin playing can be heard on the soundtrack of The Godfather. Other credits include West Side Story and Who's Afraid of Virginia Woolf?. He continued playing jazz as well, with Bobby Troup, Ray Anthony, Harry James, Buddy Collette, Stan Kenton, Gerald Wilson and Terry Gibbs. He also worked as a session musician on over 500 albums, including releases by Jimmy Witherspoon, Helen Humes, June Christy,  Natalie Cole, Neil Diamond, Ella Fitzgerald, Marvin Gaye, Steve Lawrence, Julie London, Anita O'Day, Nelson Riddle, Linda Ronstadt and Joe Williams. Viola and Cavanaugh reunited in the 1980s with Phil Mallory and continued to play regularly in Los Angeles until the late 1990s.

Death
Viola died of cancer in 2007 at the age of 87.

Discography

As leader
 Solo Guitar (Mode, 1957)
 Guitars (Liberty, 1959)
 Guitars Vol. 2 (Liberty, 1959)
 Imagination (Liberty, 1960)
 Guitar Lament (World Pacific, 1961)
 Alone Again (Legend, 1973)
 Salutations F.S. (PBR, 1977)
 Prelude to a Kiss (PBR, 1980)
 Mello as a Cello (Starline, 1994)
 Stringin' the Blues with Howard Alden, Bucky Pizzarelli, Frank Vignola (Jazzology, 2003)

As sideman
 Steve Allen, Terry Gibbs, Captain (Mercury, 1958)
 Laurindo Almeida, Viva Bossa Nova! (Capitol, 1962)
 Laurindo Almeida, Acapulco '22 (Capitol, 1963)
 The Beach Boys, The Beach Boys' Christmas Album (Capitol, 1964)
 Hadda Brooks, Anytime, Anyplace, Anywhere (DRG, 1994)
 Hadda Brooks, Time Was When (Pointblank, 1996)
 Roy Burns, Big, Bad & Beautiful (FPM, 1973)
 Red Callender, Basin Street Brass (Legend, 1973)
 June Christy, Do-Re-Mi (Capitol, 1961)
 June Christy, The Intimate Miss Christy (Capitol, 1963)
 Natalie Cole, Unforgettable... with Love (Elektra, 1991)
 Buddy Collette, Buddy's Best (Dooto, 1958)
 Buddy Collette, Polynesia (Music & Sound, 1959)
 Tommy Dorsey, The Dorsey/Sinatra Sessions 1940–1942 (RCA Victor, 1972)
 Michael Feinstein, Pure Imagination (Elektra, 1992)
 Bob Florence, Bongos/Reeds/Brass (HiFi, 1960)
 Ella Fitzgerald, Ella Fitzgerald (Verve, 1987)
 The Four Freshmen, First Affair (Capitol, 1960)
 Tommy Garrett, 50 Guitars Go South of the Border (Liberty, 1961)
 Earl Grant, The End (Decca, 1958)
 Dick Grove, Little Bird Suite (Pacific Jazz, 1963)
 Al Hibbler, Sings the Blues: Monday Every Day (Reprise, 1961)
 Helen Humes, Helen Humes (Contemporary, 1960)
 Helen Humes, Swingin' with Humes (Contemporary, 1961)
 Calvin Jackson, Jazz Variations On Gershwin's Rhapsody in Blue (Liberty, 1957)
 Harry James, Harry James and His New Swingin' Band (MGM, 1959)
 Harry James, Harry James Twenty-fifth Anniversary Album (MGM, 1964)
 Julie London, Lonely Girl (Liberty, 1956)
 Julie London, Julie...at Home (Liberty, 1960)
 Shelly Manne, My Son the Jazz Drummer!  (Contemporary, 1963)
 Anita O'Day, Trav'lin' Light (Verve, 1961)
 Frankie Ortega, The Piano Styling of Frankie Ortega (Imperial, 1956)
 Frankie Ortega, Keyboard Caravan (Imperial, 1959)
 André Previn, Previn at the Piano (RCA Victor, 1947)
 André Previn, Skylark (RCA Victor, 1955)
 Terry Reid, Seed of Memory (ABC, 1976)
 Rudy Render, If You Knew Rudy (Page, 1957)
 Googie Rene, Romesville! (Class, 1959)
 Pete Rugolo, The Music from Richard Diamond (EmArcy, 1959)
 Pete Rugolo, Ten Trumpets and 2 Guitars (Mercury, 1961)
 Warren Schatz, Warren Schatz (Columbia, 1971)
 Frank Sinatra, Forever Frank (Capitol, 1966)
 Frank Sinatra, Francis Albert Sinatra & Antonio Carlos Jobim (Reprise, 1967)
 Joanie Sommers, Softly the Brazilian Sound (Warner Bros., 1964)
 The Strollers, Swinging Flute in Hi-Fi (Score, 1958)
 The Sugar Shoppe, The Sugar Shoppe (Now Sounds, 2013)
 The Manhattan Transfer, Mecca for Moderns (Atlantic, 1981)
 Bobby Troup, Do Re Mi (Liberty, 1957)
 Joe Williams, With Love (Temponic, 1972)
 Jimmy Witherspoon, Spoon (Reprise, 1961)
 Weird Al Yankovic, Dare to Be Stupid (Rock 'n' Roll 1985)
 Weird Al Yankovic, This Is the Life (Rock 'n' Roll 1984)
 Frank Zappa, Lumpy Gravy (Verve, 1967)

References
Footnotes

General references
 Al Viola at AllMusic

1919 births
2007 deaths
Guitarists from New York (state)
Jazz musicians from New York (state)
Musicians from Brooklyn
20th-century American guitarists
20th-century American male musicians
American jazz guitarists
American male guitarists
American people of Italian descent
Burials at Forest Lawn Memorial Park (Hollywood Hills)
Deaths from cancer in California
American male jazz musicians
United States Army personnel of World War II